Richard Wilkins or Rick Wilkins may refer to:
Richard Wilkins (TV presenter) (born 1954), Australian TV presenter
Richard Wilkins (law) (1952–2012), assistant solicitor general in the US during the 1980s and advocate of international recognition of the family
Richard Wilkins (footballer) (born 1965), English footballer and manager
Rick Wilkins (musician) (born 1937), Canadian composer, conductor, and jazz musician
Rick Wilkins (baseball) (born 1967), American baseball player
Dick Wilkins (Richard Maurice Wilkins), American football player
Richard Wilkins (Buffy the Vampire Slayer), fictional mayor of Sunnydale in the TV series Buffy the Vampire Slayer